Reza Rohani (born October 31, 1977) is an Iranian pianist and composer. He is the son of Iranian composer Anoushiravan Rohani. He was one of the judges in the Iranian television reality music competition, Stage on Manoto.

Early life 

Rohani was born in 1977. At the age of 15, he left Tehran and travelled to Germany to study classical music. After finishing school after three years in the Bavarian College of Music, he studied jazz. In 2005 he graduated from Hochschule Fur Music und Theatre in Hannover.

Discography

Studio albums

Rohani has published three albums, and several singles with Sara Naeini.

 Fragile Silence, 2010
 Moonseed, 2010
 Gypsy, 2015

Singles
 "Bayad Del Sepord"
 "Jadoo" (ft. Sara Naeini)
 '"Jane Maryam"
 "Mano To"
 "Asheghe Khoondan" (ft. Sara Naeini)
 "Nafas"
 "Emshab" (ft. Sara Naeini)
 "Didare Jodaee" (ft. Sara Naeini)

References

External links
Reza Rohani official Instagram page

Iranian composers
1977 births
Living people
Iranian songwriters
Iranian singer-songwriters
People from Rasht
21st-century pianists
21st-century composers
Iranian music arrangers